Pärsti is a village in Viljandi Parish, Viljandi County, Estonia. It has a population of 164 (as of 4 January 2010).

Javelin thrower Risto Mätas (born 1984) was born in Pärsti.

References

Villages in Viljandi County
Kreis Fellin